Euryzygoma is an extinct genus of marsupial which inhabited humid eucalyptus forests in Queensland and New South Wales during the Pliocene of Australia. Euryzygoma is believed to have weighed around 500 kg, and differed from other diprotodonts in having unusual, flaring cheekbones that may have been used either for storing food or for sexual display. Euryzygoma is thought to be the ancestral genus from which Diprotodon evolved.

References 

 "Australia's Lost World: Prehistoric Animals of Riversleigh" by Michael Archer, Suzanne J. Hand, and Henk Godthelp
 "Prehistoric Mammals of Australia and New Guinea: One Hundred Million Years of Evolution" by John A. Long, Michael Archer, Timothy Flannery, and Suzanne Hand

Pleistocene marsupials
Prehistoric vombatiforms
Pleistocene mammals of Australia
Prehistoric marsupial genera
Fossil taxa described in 1921